As Sayl as Saghir is a village in Makkah Province, in western Saudi Arabia.

See also 
 List of cities and towns in Saudi Arabia
 Miqat of Qarnul-Manazil at As-Sayl Al-Kabir
 At-Ta'if
 Regions of Saudi Arabia
 Sarat Mountains
 Hijaz Mountains
 Taif International Airport

References

External links

At-Ta'if
Populated places in Mecca Province